Siteimprove is a multinational Software-as-a-Service (SaaS) company that provides cloud-based software and services for Marketing departments to make their websites better, expanding reach to all audiences, delivering the highest conversion and ROI possible. Siteimprove was founded in 2003, is headquartered in Copenhagen, Denmark, and actively operates across North America, Europe and Asia.

History 
Morten Ebbesen founded Siteimprove in Denmark in 2003. Over the course of the next six years, the company expanded its market presence to Great Britain, USA, and Sweden. In 2010, Siteimprove joined the United Nations Global Compact corporate social responsibility (CSR) program and published its first annual CSR report. During 2012, 2013 and 2014, Siteimprove expanded its operations to Germany, The Netherlands, Norway, and Ireland. In 2015, the company expanded its market presence to Australia, Austria, Canada, Switzerland, Finland, and France. 

In 2017, Siteimprove expanded into Japan and acquired the Danish consultancy firm, Marketing Lion.In 2020, Nordic Capital took a majority ownership position within Siteimprove to further invest and accelerate growth.In 2021, Shane Paladin was appointed CEO to further expand global customer operations and product development.

Products 
Siteimprove’s cloud-based software products are focused across three domains, Inclusivity, Content Experience and Marketing Performance. Siteimprove's Inclusivity and Content Experience solutions automate the process of identifying errors and problems on websites, delivering performant content to the right audience, at the right time, maximizing user experience that ranks and converts across all channels. The Marketing Performance suite maximizes conversion and paid media spend, providing in-depth analytics to help companies understand where they should optimize across content and channels to drive leads and sales.

The company’s award winning web governance platform constitutes a collection of integrated tools for controlling website content, creating internal web policies, improving web accessibility in accordance with the global Web Content Accessibility Guidelines 2.0 for compliancy levels A, AA, and AAA, improving search engine optimization (SEO), monitoring website performance, identifying personal data and website cookies, and utilizing website analytics data.

References

External links 

Internet properties established in 2003
2003 establishments in Denmark